An underground lake or subterranean lake is a lake underneath the surface of the Earth. Most naturally occurring underground lakes are found in areas of Karst topography, where limestone or other soluble rock has been weathered away, leaving a cave where water can flow and accumulate. 

Natural underground lakes are an uncommon hydrogeological feature. More often, groundwater gathers in formations such as aquifers or springs. 

The largest subterranean lake in the world is in Dragon's Breath Cave in Namibia, with an area of almost ; the second largest is The Lost Sea, located inside Craighead Caverns in Tennessee, United States, with an area of

Characteristics 

An underground lake is any body of water that is similar in size to a surface lake and exists mostly or entirely underground; though, a precise scientific definition of what may be considered a "lake" is not yet well-established. Underground lakes could be classified as either “lakes” or "ponds", depending on characteristics of size, such as exposed surface area and/or depth. 

The rarity of naturally-occurring underground lakes can be attributed to the way water behaves underground. Below the surface of the Earth, pressure exterted on water increases, causing it to be absorbed into the ground. The boundary at which there is sufficient sub-terranean pressure to completely saturate the ground with water is called the water table. The area above the water table is called the “unsaturated zone,” while the area below it is called the “saturated zone” . In the saturated zone, pressure is the primary force driving the flow of water. Lakes form primarily under the force of gravity – water is pulled down to the lowest point in an area, and gathers into a lake. Any water below the water table will be under pressure, and so does not form a lake; instead, it forms an aquifer.

Naturally-occurring underground lakes can form in Karst areas, where the weathering of soluble rocks leaves behind caverns and other openings in the earth. Surface water can find its way underground through these openings and pool up in larger caverns to form lakes.

Underground lakes can be formed by human processes, such as the flooding of mines. Two examples of these are lakes found in the slate mines at Blaenau Ffestiniog, such as Croesor quarry, and a lake in the Hallein Salt Mine in Austria.

Examples 

 Craighead Caverns, in Tennessee, United States
 Dragon's Breath Cave, in Namibia
 Kow Ata, in Turkmenistan
 Moqua Well, in Nauru
 Saint-Léonard underground lake, in Switzerland
 Cross Cave, in Slovenia

Gallery

See also

References

External links

 
Caves
Karst formations